The following is a list of vehicle racing video games. The first of the genre were released in the mid-late 1970s.

List

Legend

See also
Formula One video games
V8 Supercars in video games
Racing video game
Sim racing

References

Video game lists by genre